Craig Murphy is a fine-art photographer specializing in the wet plate collodion process. Craig travels with his mobile tintype studio in upstate NY making ambrotype and tintype portrait and scenic images using the original 19th century photographic process. Craig makes images of the Hudson River in the Adirondacks and of different New York State Erie Canal locks in Cohoes, Lockport, Palmyra, NY and Waterford, NY. In addition, Craig makes handcrafted reproduction Daguerreotype tintype cases.

See also 
 Frederick Scott Archer

References

External links 

1952 births
20th-century American photographers
21st-century American photographers
American portrait photographers
Brentwood High School (Brentwood, New York) alumni
Photographers from New York (state)
Living people